The Voice of Mongolia is a Mongolian reality talent show created by John de Mol, based on the concept The Voice of Holland and it is part of an international series. It began airing on January 21, 2018 on Mongol HDTV.

The hosts are Uuganbayar Enkhbat and Ankhbayar Ganbold. The four coaches are Otgonbayar Damba (Otgoo), Bold Dorjsuren (Bold), Ulambayar Davaa (Uka), Ononbat Sed (Ononbat). Third season introduced a new coach which is Naranzun Badruugan (Naranzun) who replaced Ononbat.

Coaches and presenters

Series overview 
Colour key
 Team Otgoo
 Team Bold
 Team Uka
 Team Ononbat
 Team Naranzun

References 

Mongolian television series
The Voice of Mongolia
Mongol HD TV original programming